This article is a collection of statewide polls for the 2012 United States presidential election. The polls listed here, by state are from 2009 to December 31, 2011 and provide early data on opinion polling between a possible Republican candidate against incumbent President Barack Obama.

Note: Some states did not conduct polling before December 31, 2011

Arizona

11 electoral votes (Republican in 2004) 55%–44% (Republican in 2008) 53%–45%

Arkansas

6 electoral votes (Republican in 2004) 54%–45% (Republican in 2008) 59%–39%

California

55 electoral votes(Democratic in 2004) 54%–45% (Democratic in 2008) 61%–37%

Colorado

9 electoral votes (Republican in 2004) 52%–47% (Democratic in 2008) 54%–45%

Connecticut

7 electoral votes (Democratic in 2004) 54%–44% (Democratic in 2008) 61%–38%

Florida

29 electoral votes (Republican in 2004) 52%–47% (Democratic in 2008) 51%–48%

Georgia

16 electoral votes(Republican in 2004) 58%–41% (Republican in 2008) 52%–47%

Hawaii

4 electoral votes (Democratic in 2004) 54%–45% (Democratic in 2008) 72%–27%

Illinois

20 electoral votes (Democratic in 2004) 55%–45% (Democratic in 2008) 62%–37%

Iowa

6 electoral votes (Republican in 2004) 50%–49% (Democratic in 2008) 54%–44%

Kansas

6 electoral votes  (Republican in 2004) 62%–37% (Republican in 2008) 57%–42%

Kentucky

8 electoral votes  (Republican in 2004) 60%–40% (Republican in 2008) 57%–41%

Louisiana

8 electoral votes  (Republican in 2004) 57%–42% (Republican in 2008) 59%–40%

Maine

4 electoral votes  (Democratic in 2004) 53%–45% (Democratic in 2008) 58%–40%

Massachusetts

11 electoral votes  (Democratic in 2004) 62%–37% (Democratic in 2008) 62%–36%

Michigan

16 electoral votes  (Democratic in 2004) 51%–48% (Democratic in 2008) 57%–41%

Minnesota

10 electoral votes (Democratic in 2004) 51%–48% (Democratic in 2008) 54%–44%

Mississippi

6 electoral votes  (Republican in 2004) 59%–40% (Republican in 2008) 56%–43%

Missouri

10 electoral votes  (Republican in 2004) 53%–46% (Republican in 2008) 49%–49%

Montana

3 electoral votes  (Republican in 2004) 59%–39% (Republican in 2008) 49%–47%

Nebraska

5 electoral votes(Republican in 2004) 66%–33% (Republican in 2008) 57%–42%

Nevada

6 electoral votes  (Republican in 2004) 51%–48% (Democratic in 2008) 55%–43%

New Hampshire

4 electoral votes  (Democratic in 2004) 50%–49% (Democratic in 2008) 54%–45%

New Jersey

14 electoral votes  (Democratic in 2004) 52%–46% (Democratic in 2008) 57%–42%

New Mexico

5 electoral votes  (Republican in 2004) 50%–49% (Democratic in 2008) 57%–42%

Three Way race

New York

29 electoral votes  (Democratic in 2004) 58%–40% (Democratic in 2008) 63%–36%

North Carolina

15 electoral votes (Republican in 2004) 56%–44% (Democratic in 2008) 50%–49%

Ohio

18 electoral votes  (Republican in 2004) 51%–49% (Democratic in 2008) 52%–47%

Oregon

7 electoral votes  (Democratic in 2004) 51%–47%  (Democratic in 2008) 57%–40%

Pennsylvania

20 electoral votes (Democratic in 2004) 51%–48% (Democratic in 2008) 54%–44%

Rhode Island

4 electoral votes  (Democratic in 2004) 59%–39% (Democratic in 2008) 63%–35%

South Carolina

9 electoral votes (Republican in 2004) 58%–41% (Republican in 2008) 54%–45%

South Dakota

3 electoral votes (Republican in 2004) 60%–38% (Republican in 2008) 53%–45%

Tennessee

11 electoral votes (Republican in 2004) 57%–43% (Republican in 2008) 57%–42%

Three Way race

Texas

38 electoral votes  (Republican in 2004) 61%–38% (Republican in 2008) 55%–44%

Utah

6 electoral votes  (Republican in 2004) 72%–26%   (Republican in 2008) 62%–34%

Vermont

3 electoral votes  (Democratic in 2004) 59%–39% (Democratic in 2008) 67%–30%

Virginia

13 electoral votes  (Republican in 2004) 54%–46%   (Democratic in 2008) 53%–46%

Washington

12 electoral votes  (Democratic in 2004) 53%–46%  (Democratic in 2008) 58%–40%

West Virginia

5 electoral votes  (Republican in 2004) 56%–43%   (Republican in 2008) 56%–43%

Wisconsin

10 electoral votes  (Democratic in 2004) 50%–49%   (Democratic in 2008) 56%–42%

See also
Early 2012 statewide opinion polling for the United States presidential election, 2012
Nationwide opinion polling for the United States presidential election, 2012
Nationwide opinion polling for the Republican Party 2012 presidential primaries
Statewide opinion polling for the Republican Party presidential primaries, 2012
Statewide opinion polling for the United States presidential election, 2008
Republican Party presidential primaries, 2012

Notes

Opinion polling for the 2012 United States presidential election